Sørgulen is a fjord in Bremanger Municipality in Vestland county, Norway. It is a branch southwards off the main Gulen fjord. The fjord is the southwestern of the three branches of Gulen; the other two are Nordgulen and Midtgulen.

References

Fjords of Vestland
Bremanger